A by-election was held to elect a new governor of Kogi State on March 29, 2008.

The incumbent, Ibrahim Idris of the PDP, was re-elected to a second term in the 2007 general elections, but later in the year his election was nullified by Appeal Court  due to a complaint to the Election Petitions Tribunal by Abubakar Audu, a former governor who was excluded by INEC from participating in the 2007 elections. On February 6, 2008, the Court of Appeal upheld this ruling and ordered a new election to be held within three months. President Umaru Yar'Adua ordered the Speaker of the Kogi State Assembly to take over as acting governor.

Idris re-ran for the governorship on the PDP ticket, challenging Abubakar Audu (ANPP), Ramat Momoh (PAC) and Yusuf Obaje (DPP).

Results

References

Kogi
Kogi State gubernatorial elections
March 2008 events in Nigeria